The 2016 NXT TakeOver: Toronto was the 12th NXT TakeOver and inaugural TakeOver: Toronto professional wrestling livestreaming event produced by WWE. It was held exclusively for wrestlers from the promotion's NXT brand division. The event aired exclusively on the WWE Network and took place on November 19, 2016, at the Air Canada Centre in Toronto, Ontario, Canada as part of that year's Survivor Series weekend. It was the second NXT TakeOver held outside of the United States, after TakeOver: London in December 2015.

Five matches were contested at the event. In the main event, Samoa Joe defeated Shinsuke Nakamura to win the NXT Championship and became the first man to hold the title twice. It was also Mickie James's return to WWE for one night only in NXT.

Production

Background
TakeOver was a series of professional wrestling shows that began in May 2014, as WWE's then-developmental league NXT held their second WWE Network-exclusive event, billed as TakeOver. In subsequent months, the "TakeOver" moniker became the brand used by WWE for all of their NXT live specials. TakeOver: Toronto was scheduled as the 12th NXT TakeOver event and took place on November 19, 2016, as a support show for that year's Survivor Series pay-per-view. It was held at the Air Canada Centre and was named after the venue's city of Toronto, Ontario, Canada. It was in turn the second NXT TakeOver held outside of the United States, after TakeOver: London in 2015.

Storylines

The card comprised five matches. The matches resulted from scripted storylines, where wrestlers portrayed heroes, villains, or less distinguishable characters that built tension and culminated in a wrestling match or series of matches. Results were predetermined by WWE's writers on the NXT brand, while storylines were produced on their weekly television program, NXT.

On the September 28 episode of NXT, William Regal scheduled the second annual Dusty Rhodes Tag Team Classic, culminating with the finals at TakeOver: Toronto. The tournament started on the October 5, 2016 episode of NXT.

Event

Preliminary matches 
In the first match, Bobby Roode faced Tye Dillinger. The match ended when Roode executed a "Glorious DDT" on Dillinger to win the match.

Next, The Authors of Pain (Akam and Rezar) faced TM-61 (Nick Miller and Shane Thorne) in the final of the Dusty Rhodes Tag Team Classic, with Paul Ellering suspended above the ring inside a cage. In the end, The Authors of Pain performed "The Last Chapter" on Thorne to win the tournament.

In the third match, The Revival (Dash Wilder and Scott Dawson) defended the NXT Tag Team Championship against DIY (Johnny Gargano and Tommaso Ciampa) in a two-out-of-three falls tag team match. The Revival won the first fall after performing the "Shatter Machine" on Gargano. DIY won the second fall after performing a running knee/superkick combination on Dawson. DIY won the third fall after Dash submitted to the "Garga-No Escape" by Gargano and Dawson submitted to an armbar by Ciampa simultaneously, thus DIY won the title.

After that, Asuka defended the NXT Women's Championship against Mickie James. During the match, Mickie executed a "Mick Kick" on Asuka, but Asuka placed her foot on the bottom rope, voiding the pinfall. Asuka forced Mickie to submit to the "Asuka Lock" to win the match.

Main event 
In the main event, Shinsuke Nakamura defended the NXT Championship against Samoa Joe. During the match, Joe attempted a muscle buster but Nakamura countered and executed a "Kinshasa" on Joe for a near-fall. Nakamura attempted another "Kinshasa", but Joe avoided the attempt and applied the "Coquina Clutch". Nakamura attempted to escape, but Joe performed a German suplex followed by a dragon suplex and an X-Plex for a near-fall. When Nakamura executed another "Kinshasa" on Joe, Joe rolled out of the ring. Nakamura attempted a third "Kinshasa", but Joe avoided the attempt, attacked Nakamura with a low blow and performed a side slam onto the steel steps on Nakamura. Joe performed a muscle buster on Nakamura to win the title for a second time.

Aftermath 
Two weeks after the event, on December 3, Shinsuke Nakamura defeated Samoa Joe to win back the NXT Championship in Osaka, Japan.

NXT Post show was in Toronto on November 23 and in Ottawa on November 30

On December 29, WWE.com named The Revival vs. DIY the "WWE Match Of The Year".

Following her appearance at the event, Mickie James turned heel on the January 17, 2017 episode of SmackDown Live, doing so by helping Alexa Bliss retain the SmackDown Women's Championship against Becky Lynch in a steel cage match, while revealing herself as the villainess under the "La Luchadora" mask. The appearance marked James' return to the main roster for the first time since 2010.

The 2016 TakeOver: Toronto would be the first of two in a TakeOver: Toronto chronology, a subseries of TakeOvers that were held in Toronto, Ontario, Canada at the Air Canada Centre, which was renamed to the Scotiabank Arena in 2018. The second Toronto event was held in 2019.

Results

Dusty Rhodes Tag Team Classic bracket

References

External links 
 

Toronto
2016 WWE Network events
2016 in Toronto
Professional wrestling in Toronto
Events in Toronto
November 2016 events in the United States
WWE in Canada